The Universidad Autónoma de la Ciudad de México (UACM) (Autonomous University of Mexico City) is a public university from México City founded in 2001. Before, the Federal District was the only federal entity without a state university.

History

The UACM was established on April 26 of 2001 by Andrés Manuel López Obrador as Universidad de la Ciudad de México. The first venue was Casa Libertad, the formerly Santa Marta Acatitla women's prison and later a youth center. On December 16 of 2004 was declared autonomous.

In July 2005 the house of the artist Víctor Sergi is donated after his death and is converted in the Centro Vlady

Venues

The rectory is in Benito Juárez delegation.

Academic Venues

There are 5 academic venues, one is for postgraduates studies.

Cultural Centers

The UACM has two cultural centers Casa Talavera in Cuauhtemoc delegation and the Centro Vlady in Benito Juárez.

Programs
The UACM offers 11 bachelor's degrees, and 10 postgraduates programmes (8 master's degrees and 2 doctoral degrees).

Arts
Arts and cultural patrimony
Literature creation

Sciences
Genomic sciences
Environmental sciences and climate change

Social Sciences
Politic sciences and urban administration
Social sciences
Communications and culture
Philosophy and history of ideas
History and contemporary society
Law

Engineering
Urban transport system engineering
Industrial electronic system engineering
Electronic and telecommunication system engineering
Energy Systems Engineering

Health

Nutrition and health
Civil protection
Health promotion

References

Public universities and colleges in Mexico
Educational institutions established in 2001
2001 establishments in Mexico